The 2010 Michigan gubernatorial election was held on November 2, 2010. Incumbent Democratic Governor Jennifer Granholm was prohibited by the state's Constitution from seeking a third term. This resulted in a large pool of candidates which was whittled down, when the May 11 filing deadline passed, to two Democrats and five Republicans. Both the Cook Political Report and the non-partisan Rothenberg Political Report rated the election as leaning Republican.

The Republican primary race was highly competitive; both local and national polling reported Congressman Peter Hoekstra, state Attorney General Mike Cox, and businessman Rick Snyder as being front-runners for the Republican Party nomination. The Democratic front-runner when the 2009 polls were conducted, Lieutenant Governor John D. Cherry, withdrew from the race in January 2010. The final polls just days before the primary election showed that, while Lansing mayor Virg Bernero was in the lead, over a quarter of those polled were still undecided. The deadline for candidates to file nominating petitions for the August 3 state primary was 4:00 PM on May 11, 2010.

A total of 1,575,167 registered voters voted in the primaries, with 66.4% of them voting in the Republican primary. Analysts believe a large portion of Democrats crossed party lines to vote for Snyder, whose ad campaign targeted bipartisan and independent support. In Michigan, voters may vote in either primary regardless of their political affiliation, but can only vote for one party. Ballots with split tickets are not counted in partisan races. Both races came in more disparate than predicted. Snyder won with a near 10-point lead over closest rival Pete Hoekstra, and Bernero won with an even larger 17-point lead over early favorite state house speaker Andy Dillon. Both nominees portrayed themselves as political outsiders. On August 25, Snyder appointed State Representative Brian Calley as his running mate. On August 28, Bernero appointed Southfield Mayor Brenda Lawrence as his running mate. 

Snyder won a decisive victory over Bernero in the general election, winning by nearly 20 percentage points. , this was the last time the counties of Ingham and Marquette voted for the Republican candidate.

Democratic primary

Candidates

Declared
Virg Bernero, Mayor of Lansing
 Andy Dillon, Speaker of the Michigan House of Representatives

Withdrew
 Robert Bowman, former Michigan treasurer (ended exploratory bid on February 15, 2010)
 John D. Cherry, Lieutenant Governor (ended exploratory bid on January 5, 2010)
 Hansen Clarke, member of the Michigan Senate (ended bid on January 15, 2010; ran for Congress instead)
 John Freeman, former member of the Michigan House of Representatives (ended bid on January 11, 2010)
 Dan Kildee, former Genesee County Treasurer (ended exploratory bid on March 5, 2010)
 Alma Wheeler Smith, member of the Michigan House of Representatives (ended exploratory bid on May 10, 2010)

Polling

Results

Republican primary

Candidates

Declared
 Mike Bouchard, Sheriff of Oakland County and nominee for U.S. Senate in 2006
 Mike Cox, Michigan Attorney General
 Tom George, state senator
 Pete Hoekstra, U.S. Representative
Rick Snyder, businessman

Withdrew
 David Kniffen, businessman
 Terri Lynn Land, Michigan Secretary of State (became Bouchard's running mate)
 Tim Rujan, Huron County Commissioner (failed to qualify)

Polling

Results

Other parties
Based on past election performance, the Libertarian Party of Michigan, Green Party of Michigan, and the U.S. Taxpayers Party of Michigan (affiliated with the Constitution Party) have automatic ballot access for the general election, but by state law they must nominate candidates through party conventions rather than primary elections. The Natural Law Party also has automatic ballot access in Michigan, but chose not to run a candidate for governor in 2010.

Libertarian Party candidates
The Libertarian Party of Michigan nominee was Kenneth Proctor. The nomination was won at the Michigan Libertarian Convention held in Okemos, Michigan on Saturday, May 22, in accordance with Michigan state law. He beat out Bhagwan Dashairya, who had been the 2006 U.S. Taxpayers Party nominee for governor. The delegates ended up selecting Dashairya as the Libertarian nominee for U.S. Congress in District 8.

Proctor's running mate was Dr. Erwin Haas, Maryland of Grand Rapids. Haas received the Lt. Governor nomination unanimously.

Green Party candidates
The Green Party of Michigan held their statewide nominating convention July 31 and August 1 in Lansing, and nominated Harley Mikkelson for governor and Lynn Meadows for lieutenant governor.

U.S. Taxpayers Party candidates
The 2010 U.S. Taxpayers Party of Michigan convention was held on June 26 in East Lansing. In a nearly unanimous vote, Stacey Mathia and Chris Levels were formally nominated as candidates of the U.S. Taxpayers Party of Michigan for the offices of governor and lieutenant governor.

According to Stacey Mathia's official press release, "The Convention applauded Mathia's agenda to institute Law-Abiding Constitutional Government and State Sovereignty in order to free the People of Michigan from the political oppression of big government operating outside of its authority."

The press release also stated, "Chris Levels, is currently well known as a radio talk show host on WSNL in the Flint, Michigan area. His last minute nomination speech will be available on Mathia's website. The USTPM Convention gave him a standing applause."

General election

Debates
On August 12, it was reported that Virg Bernero accepted invitations to three debates. The first debate would be held September 21 and sponsored by WOOD-TV in Grand Rapids. The second debate would be held October 7 and be broadcast on 55 radio and TV stations throughout the state. The third debate would be held October 21 and would be sponsored by WXYZ-TV, WWJ (AM) and Crain's Detroit Business. Then in early September, Bernero offered Snyder a deal of eight debates. Snyder proposed a counter-offer of three debates, which Bernero refused. A Detroit Free Press editorial was critical of Snyder for not agreeing to debates. Bernero called Snyder a wimp for not agreeing to debate him. An impromptu debate developed after Bernero crashed a town hall meeting Snyder was hosting in Westland on September 13. The two sides agreed to an hour-long televised debate, broadcast on October 10 from the studios of WTVS in Wixom. A group of Detroit clergy invited the two major party candidates to a debate there on October 21.  Only Bernero accepted the invitation.

Predictions

Polling

Results

Results by county

See also
2010 United States gubernatorial elections

References

External links

Elections in Michigan from the Michigan Secretary of State
2010 Official Michigan General Candidate Listing
Michigan Governor Candidates at Project Vote Smart
Campaign contributions for 2010 Michigan Governor from Follow the Money

2010 Michigan Governor General Election: Rick Snyder (R) vs Virg Bernero (D) graph of multiple polls from Pollster.com
Election 2010: Michigan Governor from Rasmussen Reports
2010 Michigan Governor Race from Real Clear Politics
2010 Michigan Governor's Race from CQ Politics
Race Profile in The New York Times

Debates
Michigan Democratic Gubernatorial Primary Debate on C-SPAN, June 21, 2010
Michigan Republican Gubernatorial Primary Debate on C-SPAN, June 24, 2010
Michigan Republican Gubernatorial Primary Debate on C-SPAN, July 13, 2010

Official campaign sites (archived)
Virg Bernero
Mike Bouchard
Mike Cox
Tom George
Pete Hoekstra
Stacey Mathia
Ken Proctor
Rick Snyder

Gubernatorial
2010
2010 United States gubernatorial elections